Shaoxing University is located in Shaoxing, Zhejiang, China.

History
The University is located on the south-west side of Shaoxing city and has managed to grow in popularity and strength over the last decade. The University was founded in 1909 as the Shankuai Primary Normal School. The great modern Chinese author Lu Xun (1881-1936) is a native of Shaoxing. He was the education inspector for the school. In 1996, Shaoxing University was established from the merger of several higher education institutions such as Shaoxing Teachers College and Shaoxing Advanced Professional College.

Administration 
The university is organised into the following administrative divisions.

Administrative offices 
President's Office 
Office of International Cooperation and Exchange
Academic Affairs Office
Admission and Graduate Affairs Office 
Student Affairs Office 
Science and Technology Administration Office 
Press Release Center
Human Resources Department
Retired Personnel Affairs Office
Security and Safeguard Department 
Finance Department 
University Enterprise Administration Office 
General Affairs Office
University Assets Administration Office 
Construction and Campus Planning Office
Maintenance and Campus Administration Office

Colleges and departments 
The university is organized into the following colleges and departments.
Faculty of Foreign Languages
Faculty of Law
Cai Yuanpei Art College
Faculty of Physical Education
Faculty of Economics and Business Administration
Faculty of Mathematics Physics and Information Science
Faculty of Engineering
Faculty of medical Science 
Shangyu College 
College of Primary Education 
Department of Chinese Language and literature 
Department of Chemistry
Department of Biology 
Department of Pedagogy 
Yuanpei college 
College of Adult Education 
Orchid Pavilion Calligraphy College 
College of Private Business Management 
College of Vocational Training

References

External links
Shaoxing University Official website
Shaoxing University Official website 
Shaoxing University Official website (Archive)
Shaoxing University Official website (Archive)  (Archive)

Universities and colleges in Zhejiang
Educational institutions established in 1909
1909 establishments in China